Seyyed Mohammad Bagher Najafi Shoushtari (January 1948 – July 2002) was a prominent Iranian scholar of Iranian Studies, in particular Iranian art and culture, and Islamic Studies. He is the author of many scholarly books and articles.

Bibliography 

Bagher Najafi is the author of over forty books and hundreds of articles on Iranian and Islamic studies, including:

External links 
Princeton University Library Catalog

1948 births
2002 deaths
Iranian scholars